Lastra is a surname. Notable people with the surname include: 

Adriana Lastra (born 1979), Spanish politician
Alfonso Lastra Chárriez (1887-1946), Puerto Rican lawyer and politician
Anselmo Lastra, American computer scientist
Cecilio Lastra (born 1951), Spanish boxer
Francisco de la Lastra (1777–1852), Chilean military officer
Gabriela Lastra (born 1980), American tennis player
Gladys de la Lastra (1932-2005), Panamanian musician and composer
Héctor Lastra (1943–2006), Argentine writer
Jonathan Lastra (born 1993), Spanish cyclist
Osbaldo Lastra (born 1983), Ecuadorian footballer
Pedro Lastra (born 1932), Chilean poet and essayist
Ricardo Cortés Lastra, Spanish politician
Rodrigo Lastra (born 1998), Argentine footballer
Yolanda Lastra (born 1932), Mexican linguist